Prospect Cottage is a house on the coast in Dungeness, Kent. Originally a Victorian fisherman's hut, the house was purchased by director and artist Derek Jarman in 1987, and was his home until his death in 1994.

Jarman bought the house following the death of his father, at a time when he was looking to leave London. Actress and friend Tilda Swinton recalls Jarman buying "gallons of pitch black paint" to redecorate. The cottage facade of tarred boards and bright yellow paintwork were maintained from the previous owners. The timber walls of the cottage are weatherproofed with tar, and one wall is decorated with lines from the John Donne poem "The Sun Rising". Jarman's 1990 film The Garden was filmed at the house.

Jarman cultivated a garden in the shingle surrounding the cottage, a mixture of sculptures assembled from driftwood and other flotsam from the beaches of Dungeness, and hardy plants which could survive the coastal weather, supported by manure from a local farm dug into small holes in the shingle. Writing of his early months at Prospect Cottage, he said that initially "people thought I was building a garden for magical purposes - a white witch out to get the nuclear power station". Jarman described his garden as "a therapy and a pharmacopoeia", and would go on to write a book about it, Derek Jarman's Garden, illustrated with photographs by Howard Sooley and published posthumously in June 1995. A set of prints of the photographs was acquired by the Garden Museum for its collection in 2012.

The gardeners Beth Chatto and Christopher Lloyd stumbled across Prospect Cottage and its garden in the summer of 1990; the garden became the inspiration for the Gravel Garden at Beth Chatto Gardens at Elmstead Market in Essex.

After Jarman's death in 1994, the cottage was bequeathed to his partner Keith Collins. The house was put up for sale in 2018 after Collins' death, its interior still containing artwork by Jarman's friends and admirers, including Maggi Hambling, John Maybury, Gus Van Sant and Richard Hamilton.

With the possibility of the house being sold privately, Art Fund launched a campaign in January 2020 to raise money for "a permanently funded programme to conserve and maintain the building, its contents and its garden for the future". The appeal was featured on an episode of BBC1's Countryfile in February 2020, with rare filming inside the cottage allowed for the programme. As part of the fundraising efforts, costume designer Sandy Powell, a friend of Jarman's, collected film stars' signatures on her cream calico suit at the 2020 BAFTAs award show and 2020 Oscars ceremony, with the suit auctioned online between 4 and 11 March by Phillips auction house, London. and selling for £16,000. 

It was announced in April 2020 that, thanks to these fundraising efforts, Prospect Cottage had been saved for the nation with Creative Folkestone becoming the custodians of the property. In 2022, a job advert was reported seeking a guardian for the property.

The cottage and its garden were the subject of an exhibition at the Garden Museum in London in 2020. In April 2022 the cottage featured in the episode of the BBC Two series Secrets of the Museum that focused on Sandy Powell's autographed suit.

References

External links
 The Art Fund appeal for Derek Jarman's Prospect Cottage
The online auction for Sandy Powell's suit
Sandy Powell on her time at Prospect Cottage

Houses in Kent
Gardens in Kent